Yuniel Dorticós Pao (born 11 March 1986) is a Cuban professional boxer. He is a two-time former cruiserweight world champion, having held the WBA title from 2017 to 2018 and the IBF title from 2019 to 2020. As of August 2022, he is ranked as the world's third best active cruiserweight by The Ring magazine and the Transnational Boxing Rankings Board, and sixth by BoxRec.

Amateur career
He placed second three times in a row at the Cuban national championships from 2005- 2007 at light-heavyweight, each time behind Yusiel Nápoles. In 2008 he came in third, after losing to future Olympic gold medalist Julio César La Cruz in the semifinals. Dorticos represented Cuba twice in the Boxing World Cup.

World Cup results
2005 (light heavyweight)
Defeated Elnur Kadyrov (Azerbaijan) RSC-3
Defeated Ovidiu Chereches (Romania) RSC-2
Lost to Yerdos Zhanabergenov (Kazakhstan) RSCI-2

2006 (light heavyweight)
Defeated Erbol Dutbayev (Kazakhstan) RSC-OS
Defeated Christopher Downs (United States) 39-19
Defeated Javid Taghiev (Azerbaijan) RSC-OS
Lost to Artur Beterbiev (Russia) RSC-1

Professional career

Early career
Dorticos defected in 2009 and began a career in the paid ranks, fighting as a cruiserweight. Dorticos slowly worked his way up the ranks, fighting outmatched opponents. He won his first 17 fights by knockout (KO). In February 2014, Dorticos defeated Hamilton Ventura in his 16th professional fight. Dorticos completely overwhelmed Ventura, knocking him down three times before the referee stopped the fight. With the win, Dorticos broke into the top 15 of the WBA and WBC.

Dorticos was knocked down for the first time in the first round of a bout against Eric Fields. He was able to dust himself off and return the knockdown towards the end of that same round. Dorticos knocked out Fields at 2 minutes 59 seconds in round four. In April 2014, Dorticos would go the distance for the first time, as Edison Miranda was able to take his power. Nevertheless, Dorticos won a wide unanimous decision (100–90, 100–90, 99–91). Dorticos sought fights against Murat Gassiev, Beibut Shumenov, and Denis Lebedev but was ultimately unable to get any of them in the ring.

WBA interim cruiserweight champion

Dorticos vs. Kalenga
Dorticos became the mandatory to the WBA's champion Denis Lebedev following a win over Fulgencio Zúñiga. However, the WBA allowed Lebedev to unify against IBF title-holder Victor Emilio Ramírez before facing Dorticos. In turn, the WBA ordered Dorticos to fight Youri Kalenga for an interim championship. The fight was due for 20 May 2016 at the Palais des Sports in Paris. This would be Dorticos' first pro bout outside the United States.

In a thrilling fight, Dorticos stopped Kalenga in the tenth round via technical knockout (TKO) to become a world champion. Dorticos dropped Kalenga in the second round after a flurry of shots. Kalenga was able to recover and get back into the fight in the middle rounds, despite receiving a cut over one of his eyes during round six. Dorticos lost a point at the end of round eight for hitting after the bell. In round ten, Dorticos once again landed a flurry a punches on Kalenga, at which point the referee stopped the fight.

Following his victory, Dorticos entered a purse bid for a fight against WBA (Regular) champion Beibut Shumenov. The fight was delayed several times, due to promotional issues before being called off due to an eye injury that Shumenov suffered during sparring. In June 2017, Shumenov vacated his title due to that same injury. The WBA elevated Dorticos from interim champion to regular champion, despite Dorticos being away from the ring for over a year.

2017-18 World Boxing Super Series

A day after being elevated to WBA (Regular) champion, Dorticos joined the World Boxing Super Series. The Super Series is a single-elimination tournament featuring 8 fighters from the cruiserweight division. The field includes title-holders from all 4 of boxing's major sanctioning bodies. Dorticos was revealed to be the tournament's 4th seed.

Dorticos vs. Kudryashov
On the tournament's draft, it was determined that Dorticos would face Dmitry Kudryashov in the quarterfinals. The fight was set for 23 September at the Alamodome in San Antonio, Texas. This will be the Super Series' first match in the United States. A percentage of the gate revenue will be donated to the San Antonio Food Bank to aid victims of Hurricane Harvey. At the official weigh-in, Dmitry Kudryashov initially missed weight by half a pound, coming in at 200 1⁄2 lbs. However, he was able to come in at exactly 200 lbs in a second try 45 minutes later. Dorticos weighed in at 199 lbs.

On fight night, Dorticos retained his title and advanced to the semi-finals by knocking out Kudryashov in two rounds. The fight started with a slow-paced, feel out round, with both boxers studying their opponent. Dorticos successfully executed a pull counter as the bell sounded. In round two, the pace of the fight increased, with Dorticos and Kudryashov trading combinations. Eventually, Dorticos gained the upper hand by landing a series of one-two combos, as Kudryashov retreated behind his high guard. Dorticos ended the contest by knocking out Kudryashov with a right hook. The referee waived the count with a minute left in round two. Dorticos is expected to face the winner of Gassiev-Włodarczyk and stated that he would prefer to face Gassiev.

2018-19 World Boxing Super Series

Dorticos vs. Masternak
Dorticos participated in the 2018-19 World Boxing Super Series Cruiserweight tournament as well. It was announced that he would face the one-time WBA Interim cruiserweight title challenger Mateusz Masternak in the quarterfinal bout, which was held on October 20, 2018, at the CFE Arena in Orlando, Florida. Masternak was ranked #4 by the WBA, #6 by the WBO, #8 by the IBF and #11 WBC. The fight was scheduled as the main event of a DAZN card. Dorticos was expected to beat Masternak, and came into the fight as the betting favorite. He won the fight by unanimous decision, with two judges awarding him a 115-113 scorecard, while the third judge scored it 116-112 in his favor.

Dorticos vs. Tabiti
Dorticos advanced to the tournament semifinals, where was set to face the reigning IBF titleholder Andrew Tabiti, who earned his berth with a unanimous decision victory against Ruslan Fayfer. The fight was scheduled as the co-main event of a DAZN card held on June 15, 2019, at the Arēna Rīga in Rīga, Latvia. Tabiti was ranked #1 by the IBF, #2 by the WBA and WBC and #6 by the WBO. Tabiti was confident in his ability to beat Dorticos during the pre-fight interviews, stating: "I’ve watched his fights, I think it is fair to say that he is flat-footed. He’s one dimensional in the sense that he relies on his knockout punch, he can’t really box". The close nature of the bout was reflected in the betting lines, which saw Dorticos as the -197 favorite and Tabiti as the +172 underdog. Dorticos won the fight by a tenth-round knockout, flooring Tabiti with a well placed right hand, which left him unable to rise from the canvas for several minutes afterwards.

Dorticos vs. Briedis
Dorticos was scheduled to face the former WBO cruiserweight titlist Mairis Briedis in the WBSS tournament finals. The bout was originally supposed to be a title unification bout, however, Briedis was stripped of his title as he refused to rematch Krzysztof Glowacki. The Dorticos and Briedis clash was scheduled as the main event of a DAZN card held on March 21, 2020, at the Arēna Rīga in Rīga, Latvia. Briedis was ranked #6 by the IBF at cruiserweight. The developing COVID-19 pandemic forced the WBSS to postponed the bout on March 14, 2020. The fight was postponed until May 16. On April 15, 2020, the fight was once again postponed, this time for September 26, 2020. Briedis won the fight by majority decision, with two judges awarding him a 117-111 scorecard, while the third judge scored it as a 114-114 draw. Dorticos had a good start to the fight, but flagged as the fight progressed, with Briedis landing the more damaging shots.

Continued cruiserweight career
Dorticos faced Jesse Bryan on November 20, 2021, at the Manual Artime Community Center Theater in Miami, Florida. He won the fight by a second-round technical knockout, after knocking Bryan down twice in the first round.

Professional boxing record

See also
List of cruiserweight boxing champions

References

External links

Yunier Dorticos Partial Record (Amateur Boxing Results)
Yunier Dorticos - Profile, News Archive & Current Rankings at Box.Live

1986 births
Living people
Cruiserweight boxers
World cruiserweight boxing champions
World Boxing Association champions
International Boxing Federation champions
Boxers from Havana
Cuban male boxers
21st-century Cuban people